Krista Woodward (born 22 November 1984) is Canadian track and field athlete specialising in the javelin throw. She won the gold medal at the 2013 Jeux de la Francophonie. She also competed at the 2013 World Championships failing to advance to the final.

Her personal best in the event is 60.15 metres set in Tokyo in 2013.

Competition record

References

1984 births
Living people
Canadian female javelin throwers
World Athletics Championships athletes for Canada
Canadian Track and Field Championships winners
20th-century Canadian women
21st-century Canadian women